Space Shuttle Inspiration is a full-scale Space Shuttle mockup built in 1972 by North American Rockwell. The plastic and wood model was made to promote the company's bid to construct the Space Shuttle fleet.

History 
The Space Shuttle Orbiter mockup was constructed by North American Rockwell in 1972.  It was shown to NASA and Congress to win approval for the Space Shuttle program.  The mockup is approximately the same size and shape as an actual Orbiter.  It was also used to design cable harnesses for production shuttle Orbiters and to test-fit flight hardware.

The mockup was abandoned in place by NASA, so the owners of the property placed it on temporary display at the Columbia Memorial Space Center in Downey, California, in July 2012.

Refurbishment and naming 
After sitting in storage for many years, in 2012, the owners decided to refurbish Inspiration. A 2009 grant proposal estimated the cost of refurbishment and housing at $1,880,000, with about half going to restoration efforts and half to construction of a permanent facility.

"Some deterioration processes are already underway. The outer skin of the shuttle, made of plywood on a wooden frame, is buckling slightly and showing signs of internal delamination. Paper components representing insulation or other lining of the sub-deck are disintegrating. Adhesive mounts and backing for a range of fasteners have become yellowed and embrittled. Delicate plastic components also appear to be degrading slightly. Clear plastic, prismatic ceiling panels have fine crazing cracks, and are starting to become detached at their fasteners."

Originally unnamed, it was named Inspiration on September 24, 2012.

Display and storage 
Inspiration was housed in a tent outside the Columbia Memorial Space Science Learning Center in Downey, California. Despite receiving a $3 million federal loan in May 2013 to build a community center to house the mockup, the Downey City Council voted to place Inspiration into storage until an executive director was hired to oversee the project. On March 4 and 5, 2014, the replica was disassembled and moved to the city's maintenance yard.

See also 
 Space Shuttle Independence, the full-scale mock-up made from blueprints, used as an exhibit at Space Center Houston
 Space Shuttle Pathfinder, a fit-test mock-up

References

External links 
 Columbia Space Science site

Space Shuttle tourist attractions
Downey, California
Tourist attractions in Los Angeles County, California
Replica spacecraft